Orangeburg may refer to:
Orangeburg, New York
Orangeburg, South Carolina
Orangeburg County, South Carolina
Orangeburg Dodgers, a minor league baseball team
Orangeburg Municipal Airport, a public airport
Orangeburg Railway, a shortline railroad
Orangeburg pipe, a type of pipe made from tar paper
Orangeburg massacre, an incident on February 8, 1968